Sepia adami is a species of cuttlefish native to the southwestern Indian Ocean. It is known only from the type locality, S 79ºE off Cape Natal. It lives at a depth of up to 99 m.

Females are known to reach a mantle length of at least 59 mm.

The type specimen is deposited at the South African Museum.

References

External links

Cuttlefish
Molluscs described in 1972